Dan or Daniel Massey may refer to:
*Daniel Massey (manufacturer) (1798–1856), farm implement manufacturer
Daniel Massey (actor) (1933–1998), British Canadian actor
Dan Massey (1942–2013), American LGBT rights/sexual freedom activist